Lake Verret is  natural lake located in Assumption, Parish, Louisiana, US.

Lake Verret is named after the first Spanish commandant Nicolas Verret. A historical monument was placed in front of the Assumption Parish Courthouse.

Elm Hall Wildlife Management Area sits on the northeast side of Lake Verret. The lake drains into Grassy Lake, Lake Palourde, the Atchafalaya River, and the Gulf of Mexico

References

Verret
Verret
Wetlands and bayous of Louisiana